Ei Samay Sangbadpatra is a Bengali-language daily newspaper from The Times Group. It was launched as a broadsheet daily newspaper with a motive to enter into a head-to-head competition with Anandabazar Patrika. It is owned and published by Bennett, Coleman & Co. Ltd. which is owned by the Sahu Jain family.

The Ei Samay newspaper is considered as a challenge thrown by BCCL to Ananda Bazar Patrika (ABP) Group. Sensing the tough challenge, ABP Group started a huge media advertising campaign just a month after the launch of Ei Samay. According to company officials, this newspaper targets SEC A and A+, 20- to 35-year-old Bengalis.

Pre-launch scenario
The vernacular print media space in West Bengal comprises four major Bengali dailies: Anandabazar Patrika, Aajkaal, Bartaman and Sangbad Pratidin. Out of these, Anandabazar Patrika is said to be the dominant leader in the Bengali print media space and ranks 6th among the top 10 vernacular dailies in India as per Indian Readership Survey 2012, with a readership of about 59 lakhs.

Sections 
 Regular sections
 Ei Muhurte: contains essays on different topics, tips, and analysis on different subjects like graphology and share market
 Ei Shahar: contains news and articles related to Kolkata
 Ei Rajya: contains news and articles related to West Bengal
 Ei Desh: deals with news of national interest
 Sompadokiyo: contains editorial, on this date, essays
 Khelar Samay: sports section contains news on different sports
 Byabsa Banijyo: business section contains news related to business, economics and finance

 Other sections
 Onnya Samay: regular supplement
 Robibaroyari: Sunday special.

Editions
Currently this daily is published from Kolkata and New Delhi.

References

External links
  
 Ei Samay e-paper

Bengali-language newspapers published in India
Newspapers published in Kolkata
Publications established in 2012
Ei Samay Sangbadpatra
Publications of The Times Group
Newspapers published in Delhi
National newspapers published in India
2012 establishments in West Bengal